The Palatine T 4II was a class of saturated steam, tank locomotives operated by the Palatinate Railway.

They were to a large extent identical to the Class D XI from Bavaria, but the grate area and diameters of the carrying and coupled wheels were smaller. The rear coupled axle was housed in a Krauss-Helmholtz bogie, and the coal tanks were behind the driver's cab. It achieved its top speed on the level with a 400 tonne train.

The three examples that were built were given railway numbers 257 to 259 and the names Ulmet, Eschenau and Erdesbach. In 1925 the Deutsche Reichsbahn took all three machines over as DRG Class 98.4 with locomotive numbers 98 401–403. Until their retirement in 1933/34 the engines were stabled at Landau locomotive shed.

See also 
 Royal Bavarian State Railways 
 Palatinate Railway 
 List of Bavarian locomotives and railbuses
 List of Palatine locomotives and railbuses

References

0-6-2T locomotives
T 4.II
Railway locomotives introduced in 1900
Krauss locomotives
Standard gauge locomotives of Germany
C1′ n2t locomotives
Freight locomotives